Allahabad (also Romanized as Allāhābād) is a village in Jarqavieh Olya Rural District, Jarqavieh Olya District, Isfahan County, Isfahan Province, Iran. At the 2006 census, its population was 255, in 69 families.

References 

Populated places in Isfahan County